The ARIA Music Award for Best Adult Contemporary Album, is an award presented at the annual ARIA Music Awards, which recognises "the many achievements of Aussie artists across all music genres", since 1987. It is handed out by the Australian Recording Industry Association (ARIA), an organisation whose aim is "to advance the interests of the Australian record industry."

Solo artists and groups are eligible if they are an Australian citizen, have resided in Australia for six months for two consecutive years prior to the awards, or signed to an Australian record label (if they have met the aforementioned criteria). Only album recordings in the adult contemporary genre are eligible. The nominees and winners are chosen by a judging academy which comprises 1000 members from different areas of the music industry.

John Farnham is the most successful artist in this category with four wins from ten nominations (including collaborations) for Whispering Jack (1987), "Touch of Paradise" (1988), Romeo's Heart (1996) and The Last Time (2003).

Winners and nominees
In the following table, the winner is highlighted in a separate colour, and in boldface; the nominees are those that are not highlighted or in boldface.

Notes

References

External links

A